At least three ships of the French Navy have been named Léopard:

 , a 28-gun small ship of the line launched in 1642 and passed to Spain in 1651 by her mutinous crew.
 , a 74-gun  launched in 1787 and scuttled by fire in 1793.
 , a  launched in 1924 and lost in 1943.

French Navy ship names